The Lansdown Centre for Electronic Arts was a research centre at Middlesex University in North London, England. It played a significant role in the early development of computer graphics and continued to innovate in interactive media, sonic arts and moving image. It also provided postgraduate and undergraduate teaching.

History

The Centre for Electronic Arts was renamed the Lansdown Centre for Electronic Arts after the death of the computer graphics pioneer John Lansdown, its head from 1993 until 1997. Its roots lay in the work of John Vince to develop computer graphics at the university (then a polytechnic). From the 1970s, Vince and others developed two suites of computer graphics subroutines in the FORTRAN programming language, initially to create line drawings of 2D and 3D objects and, later, full colour images with smooth Gouraud and Phong shading. This work fed into short courses attended by media personnel.

In 1985, Middlesex had been awarded the status of National Centre for Computer Aided Art and Design, under Paul Brown. The UK's first MSc course in Computer Graphics was developed there. One graduate, Keith Waters, went on to a PhD in 1988, awarded for his development of a muscle-based model for facial animation.

The 2008 book White Heat Cold Logic records the pioneering role of Middlesex Polytechnic in British computer art, as does the CACHe project.

See also
 Event One (1969)

References

External links
Archived website of the Lansdown Centre for Electronic Arts website

Educational institutions with year of establishment missing
Art schools in London
Middlesex University
Computer art
Computer graphics organizations